Samuel Knibb (1625–1674) was a clockmaker and instrument-maker.

He was born in Newport, Wales. Active between 1663 and 1670, he moved to London to work in Henri Sutton's (c. 1637–1665) shop. Together, they built an important arithmetical calculator and many quadrants. He also worked with his cousin, Joseph Knibb.

References

External links

British scientific instrument makers
1625 births
1674 deaths
Welsh engineers
People from Newport, Wales